Grand Ayatollah Mohammad Mohammad Taher Aleshobair Khagani  (Arabic:  محمد محمد طاهــــر آل شبيـر الخاقانـــــي) (born 1940) is an Iraqi Twelver Shi'a Marja.

He has studied in seminaries of Najaf, Iraq under Grand Ayatollah Abul-Qassim Khoei and Mohammad-Reza Golpaygani.

See also
List of Maraji
Bada'
Ismailism

Notes

External links
Another personal website
Publications

Iraqi grand ayatollahs
Iraqi Islamists
Shia Islamists
1940 births
Living people